Scopula nipha is a moth of the family Geometridae. It was described by David Stephen Fletcher in 1955. It is found in the Democratic Republic of the Congo.

The male has a wingspan of 21–23 mm. This species was described from a specimen collected at the Upemba National Park

References

Moths described in 1955
nipha
Moths of Africa